Michel Bellen (13 January 1946 – 10 June 2020) also called the Wurger van Linkeroever, was a Belgian murderer regarded as the first serial killer in Flanders.

In August 1964, he raped a woman after chasing her from the supermarket in Linkeroever. The woman was able to escape. After this first rape, Bellen would eventually commit three murders. The first murder happened in December 1964. After the rape of a 21-year-old nurse, he strangled her in an alley with a piece of barbed wire. A month later, in 1965, he raped and murdered a 37-year-old nurse. He was finally sentenced in 1966 by the Assize Court to the death penalty that was later converted to life. However, in 1982 he was released on parole. After four months, however, Bellen murdered a student in her flat room in Leuven. He was imprisoned again after his conviction in March 1984. From 1989 to 1994 he corresponded with artist Danny Devos, which resulted in a number of art projects and performances.

Bellen died of heart failure in a psychiatric institution in Bierbeek on the night of 10 June 2020 at the age of 74.

See also
List of serial killers by country

References

1946 births
2020 deaths
Belgian people convicted of murder
Belgian prisoners sentenced to death
Belgian rapists
Belgian serial killers
Criminals from Antwerp
Male serial killers
Prisoners sentenced to death by Belgium
Violence against women in Belgium